The following is a list of Chinese films scheduled for release in 2019.

Highest-grossing films
These are the top 10 grossing Chinese films that were released in China in 2019:

Films

January – March

April – June

July – September

October – December

References

2019
Films
Chinese